Sandejan-e Olya (also Romanized as Sandejān-e ‘Olyā; also known as Sandegān-e ‘Olyā) is a village in Falard Rural District, Falard District, Lordegan County, Chaharmahal and Bakhtiari Province, Iran. At the 2006 census, its population was 848, in 173 families. The village is populated by Lurs.

References 

Populated places in Lordegan County
Luri settlements in Chaharmahal and Bakhtiari Province